Lophiodes beroe is a deep water dwelling fish that is elusive and does not have many remarkable traits. There is no common name for this fish yet.

L. beroe can be found on dead coral rubble, Lophelia pertusa, deep in the ocean and is often just resting and not swimming, which makes this a lie in wait predator. There are no threats that have been found at this time but further research is needed to fully understand this species.

Description 

L. beroe has a maximum length of 40 cm. They have 19 vertebrae with 6 anal spines and rays. One of the best identifying markers are the white humoral spots that are only visible on live specimens—once the specimen is preserved, the spots disappear.

Larvae of this species are hard to find due to the depths at which these fish lay their eggs. The larvae have small pectoral fins and the spines protrude a lot with a fleshy base with slight flaps.

Distribution 
L. beroe can be found in most of the Atlantic Ocean, ranging from North Carolina to the northern coast of South America; it is also found in the Northeastern Gulf of Mexico and Caribbean Sea. The fish are found at depths ranging from 370 to 860 meters at temperatures of 9 to 11 degrees Celsius.

References 

 Richards, William J. Early stages of Atlantic fishes: an identification guide for the western central North Atlantic. Boca Raton, FL: Taylor & Francis, 2006. Print.
 Encyclopedia of Life. http://eol.org/pages/214171/details
 Jones, D.O.B., Gates, A.R., Curry, R.A., Thomson, M., Pile, A., Benfield, M. (Eds) (2009). SERPENT project. Media database archive.

Lophiidae
Predators
Taxa named by John H. Caruso
Fish described in 1981